Scythris xylinochra is a moth of the family Scythrididae. It was described by Edward Meyrick in 1931. It is found in India.

The wingspan is about 12 mm. The forewings are brownish-ochreous and the hindwings are light grey.

References

xylinochra
Moths described in 1931